Jerome Bayard Clark (April 5, 1882 – August 26, 1959) was a U.S. Representative from North Carolina.

Early life
Born on Phoebus Plantation near Elizabethtown, North Carolina, Clark attended Davidson College, where he was a member of the Pi Kappa Alpha fraternity, and the University of North Carolina at Chapel Hill, where he studied law. Clark was admitted to the bar in 1906 and commenced practice in Elizabethtown, North Carolina. He married Helen Purdie Robinson and they had four children:  Martha Holton Clark, Jerome Bayard Clark Jr., Heman Robinson Clark, and Helen Purdie Clark.  From 1910-1920 Clark served as president of the Bank of Elizabethtown, and in the state House of Representatives in 1915.

Clark then moved to Fayetteville, North Carolina in 1920 and continued the practice of law, serving as a member of the State Democratic committee from 1909-1919 and, later, as a member of the North Carolina State Judicial Conference from 1924-1928.

Clark was an avid sailor, outdoorsman and noted short story writer. Many of his tales were published in The Blade Journal under his pen name, Mr. Bide. A nature park (Clark Park) is named in his honor in Fayetteville. His portrait is displayed in the Bladen County Courthouse in Elizabethtown.

US Congress
Clark was elected as a Democrat to the Seventy-first and to the nine succeeding Congresses (March 4, 1929 – January 3, 1949). Clark served as chairman of the Committee on Elections No. 1 (Seventy-second and Seventy-third Congresses).

Clark was not a candidate for renomination in 1948 and he resumed the practice of law. He died in Fayetteville, North Carolina on August 26, 1959 and is interred in Cross Creek Cemetery No. 3.

Sources

1882 births
1959 deaths
Democratic Party members of the United States House of Representatives from North Carolina
Democratic Party members of the North Carolina House of Representatives
Davidson College alumni
University of North Carolina School of Law alumni
People from Elizabethtown, North Carolina
20th-century American politicians